Touch to Touch is an album by Timmy Thomas released during 1977.

Track listing
All tracks composed by Noel Williams; except where noted
"Touch to Touch"
"Africano"
"When a House Got Music" (Luther Dixon)
"Game of Life" (Timmy Thomas)
"Love For the People"
"Torrid Zone"
"Diane" (Timmy Thomas)
"Sweet Music"

Personnel
Timmy Thomas - lead vocals, keyboards
Bert Bailey - lead guitar
Wayne Harris - rhythm guitar
Carl Crowder, Jerry Thompson - bass
Charles Hollis, Donald Bennett - drums
Harold McKinney - percussion, flute
Betty Wright - backing vocals
Mike Lewis - string arrangements
Deep Roots Band - horns, horn arrangements
Technical
Alex Sadkin, Jack Nuber - engineer
Joe Elbert - photography

1977 albums
Timmy Thomas albums
TK Records albums